Pomquet Forks is a small  community in the Canadian province of Nova Scotia, located  in Antigonish County.

References
Pomquet Forks on Destination Nova Scotia

Communities in Antigonish County, Nova Scotia
General Service Areas in Nova Scotia